In probability theory, the  Vysochanskij–Petunin inequality  gives a lower bound for the probability that a random variable with finite variance lies within a certain number of standard deviations of the variable's mean, or equivalently an upper bound for the probability that it lies further away. The sole restrictions on the distribution are that it be unimodal and have finite variance. (This implies that it is a continuous probability distribution except at the mode, which may have a non-zero probability.)
The theorem applies even to heavily skewed distributions and puts bounds on how much of the data is, or is not, "in the middle."

Theorem 

Let X be a random variable with unimodal distribution, mean μ and finite, non-zero variance σ2. Then, for any 

(For a relatively elementary proof see e.g. ). Furthermore, the equality is attained for a random variable having a probability 1 − 4/(3 λ2) of being exactly equal to the mean, and which, when it is not equal to the mean, is distributed uniformly in an interval centered on the mean. When  there exist non-symmetric distributions for which the  bound is exceeded.

Properties 

The theorem refines Chebyshev's inequality by including the factor of 4/9, made possible by the condition that the distribution be unimodal.

It is common, in the construction of control charts and other statistical heuristics, to set , corresponding to an upper probability bound of 4/81= 0.04938..., and to construct 3-sigma limits to bound nearly all (i.e. 95%) of the values of a process output.

One-sided version 

An improved version of the Vysochanskij-Petunin inequality for one-sided tail bounds exists.

The one-sided Vysochanskij-Petunin inequality, as well as the related Cantelli inequality, can for instance be relevant in the financial area, in the sense of "how bad can losses get".

See also
Gauss's inequality, a similar result for the distance from the mode rather than the mean
Rule of three (statistics), a similar result for the Bernoulli distribution

References

 
 Report (on cancer diagnosis) by Petunin and others stating theorem in English

Probabilistic inequalities
Statistical inequalities